Whelan is a surname.

Whelan may also refer to:

Places
 Whelan Nunatak, Antarctica

Organizations
 Whelan the Wrecker, Australian demolition company
 Whelan Camp, Hamilton County, New York State, USA

Court cases
 Murder of Kerry Whelan, 1995
 Whelan v. Jaslow, a 1966 copyright case
 Whelan v Waitaki Meats Ltd, a 1990 employment contract case

See also 

 
 Wheelan (disambiguation)
 Whelen (disambiguation)
 Whalen (disambiguation)